Adam Miller Jr. (born January 23, 2002) is an American college basketball player for the LSU Tigers of the Southeastern Conference (SEC). He previously played for the Illinois Fighting Illini.

High school career
In his freshman season, Miller played basketball for Manual High School in Peoria, Illinois. For his final three years of high school, he transferred to Morgan Park High School in Chicago due to his mother getting a new teaching job in the area. As a sophomore, Miller averaged 15 points per game, helping his team win the Class 3A state title. In his junior season, he averaged 29 points, 7.3 rebounds and 5.4 assists per game and was named Illinois Gatorade Player of the Year. As a senior, Miller averaged 27.4 points, 6.3 rebounds, 5.6 assists and 2.3 steals per game, leading Morgan Park to the Class 3A sectional final. He was named Illinois Mr. Basketball and repeated as Illinois Gatorade Player of the Year.

Recruiting
On November 21, 2019, Miller announced his commitment to play college basketball for Illinois over offers from Arizona and Louisville, among others.

College career
In his freshman debut on November 25, 2020, Miller scored a season-high 28 points, shooting 10-of-12 from the field and 6-of-8 from three-point range, in a 122–60 win over North Carolina A&T. He set the program record for points by a freshman in their debut. As a freshman, Miller averaged 8.3 points and 2.8 rebounds per game. After the season, he transferred to LSU over offers from Kentucky and Michigan, among others. On October 20, 2021, it was announced that Miller had torn his ACL and would miss the season.

National team career
Miller represented the United States at the 2021 FIBA Under-19 World Cup in Latvia. He averaged 7.4 points and 3.6 assists per game, helping his team win the gold medal.

Career statistics

College

|-
| style="text-align:left;"| 2020–21
| style="text-align:left;"| Illinois
| 31 || 31 || 25.5 || .391 || .340 || .684 || 2.8 || .8 || .6 || .0 || 8.3

References

External links
LSU Tigers bio
Illinois Fighting Illini bio
USA Basketball bio

2002 births
Living people
African-American basketball players
American men's basketball players
Basketball players from Chicago
Illinois Fighting Illini men's basketball players
Shooting guards
Sportspeople from Peoria, Illinois